Valentina Karatajūtė-Talimaa (born 7 December 1930) is a Lithuanian geologist and paleontologist.

She has described the following taxa:
 Altholepis Karatajute-Talimaa, 1997
 Altholepis composita Karatajute-Talimaa, 1997

References

1930 births
Lithuanian geologists
Paleontologists
Lithuanian women scientists
Vilnius University alumni
People from Lazdijai
20th-century Lithuanian women
Living people